Duchy of Lubiszewo, since 1252 or 1253 also known as the Duchy of Lubiszewo and Tczew, and the Duchy of Tczew, was a duchy in the Pomerelia centred around the towns of Lubiszewo and Tczew. Its capital was originally Lubiszewo, and since 1252 or 1253, it was moved to Tczew. Its only ruler was duke Sambor II of the Samboride dynasty.

The state was established between 1227 and 1233, in the partition of the Duchy of Świecie and Lubiszewo, as the vassal of the Duchy of Gdańsk. It existed until 1236, when it got conquered by the Duchy of Gdańsk during the war between two countries. It was reestablished in 1239 by Swietopelk II, Duke of Gdańsk, as his vassal, with Sambor II being allowed to return on the throne. It got again incorporated into the Duchy of Gdańsk in 1243. It was re-established in 1251 as the vassal of the State of the Teutonic Order. It existed until 1269, when it got incorporated into the Duchy of Świecie during the civil war in Pomerelia.

Citations

Notes

References

Bibliography 
 Gerard Labuda: Zwycięstwo ustroju wczesnofeudalnego na Pomorzu Wschodnim (1120–1310), In: Historia Pomorza, vol. 1: do roku 1466. Poznań, 1972.

Former countries in Europe
Former monarchies of Europe
Pomeranian duchies
States and territories established in the 1230s
States and territories disestablished in 1236
States and territories established in 1239
States and territories disestablished in 1243
States and territories established in 1251
States and territories disestablished in 1269
13th-century establishments in Europe
13th-century disestablishments in Europe
13th-century establishments in Poland
13th-century disestablishments in Poland